Upper Helmsley is a village and civil parish in the Ryedale district of North Yorkshire, England, about seven miles east of York. The population taken at the 2011 Census was less than 100. Details are included in the civil parish of Gate Helmsley.

History
The village is mentioned in the Domesday Book as Hamelsec in the Bulford hundred and as a possession of Ligulf. After the Norman invasion the land was granted to Count Robert of Mortain who made Nigel Fossard the local lord of the manor.

Governance
The village lies within the Thirsk and Malton UK Parliament constituency. It also lies within the Hovingham & Sheriff Hutton electoral ward of North Yorkshire County Council and the Ryedale South West ward of Ryedale District Council.

Geography
The 1881 UK Census recorded the population as 71.

Religion
There is a church in the village dedicated to St Peter, rebuilt in 1888.

References

Villages in North Yorkshire
Civil parishes in North Yorkshire

pl:Gate Helmsley